William Whiteley Lancaster (4 February 1873 – 30 December 1938) was an English first-class cricketer, who played seven games for Yorkshire County Cricket Club in 1895.

Born in Scholes, Huddersfield, Yorkshire, Lancaster was a right-handed batsman, who scored 163 runs at an average of 16.30, with a highest score of 51 against Derbyshire.  A right arm, round arm fast bowler, he bowled five overs for 29 runs without success.

Lancaster died in Marsh, Huddersfield, in December 1938, aged 65.

References

External links
Cricinfo Profile

1873 births
1938 deaths
Yorkshire cricketers
Cricketers from Huddersfield
English cricketers